Surina De Beer (born 28 June 1978) is a retired South African tennis player.

In her career, De Beer won eleven singles titles and 36 doubles titles on the ITF Women's Circuit. On 6 July 1998, she reached her best singles ranking of world No. 116. On 25 September 2000, she peaked at No. 49 in the WTA doubles rankings.

In 2011, De Beer retired from professional tennis.

ITF finals

Singles (11–6)

Doubles (36–24)

References

External links
 
 
 

1978 births
Living people
Sportspeople from Pretoria
South African female tennis players
White South African people
Grand Slam (tennis) champions in girls' doubles
US Open (tennis) junior champions